Egesta is the historic Sicilian city Segesta

It may also refer to

 Stegea, a genus of moths
 Egesta minutalis, a species in the genus
 Spatalistis egesta, a moth species
 Cymothoe egesta, a moth species